Cuproxena is a genus of moths belonging to the family Tortricidae.

Species
Cuproxena aequitana Razowski & Pelz, 2007
Cuproxena amplana Razowski & Pelz, 2007
Cuproxena anielae (Razowski & Becker, 1990)
Cuproxena argentina Brown, in Brown & Powell, 1991
Cuproxena astroboda (Razowski & Becker, 1990)
Cuproxena auga (Razowski & Becker, 1990)
Cuproxena auriculana Razowski & Pelz, 2007
Cuproxena binotata Brown & Obraztsov in Brown & Powell, 1991
Cuproxena bramiliana Brown, in Brown & Powell, 1991
Cuproxena cara Brown, in Brown & Powell, 1991
Cuproxena chelograpta (Meyrick, 1917)
Cuproxena cornuta Brown & Obraztsov in Brown & Powell, 1991
Cuproxena duckworthorum Brown, in Brown & Powell, 1991
Cuproxena elongana Brown, in Brown & Powell, 1991
Cuproxena eudiometra (Razowski & Becker, 1990)
Cuproxena flintana Brown, in Brown & Powell, 1991
Cuproxena flosculana (Walsingham, 1914)
Cuproxena golondrina Razowski & Wojtusiak, 2008
Cuproxena hoffmanana Brown, in Brown & Powell, 1991
Cuproxena latiana Brown, in Brown & Powell, 1991
Cuproxena minimana Brown, in Brown & Powell, 1991
Cuproxena neonereidana Brown, in Brown & Powell, 1991
Cuproxena nereidana (Zeller, 1866)
Cuproxena nudana Razowski & Pelz, 2007
Cuproxena paracornuta Brown, in Brown & Powell, 1991
Cuproxena paramplana Razowski & Pelz, 2007
Cuproxena platuncus Razowski & Wojtusiak, 2010
Cuproxena pseudoplesia Brown, in Brown & Powell, 1991
Cuproxena quinquenotata (Walker, 1863)
Cuproxena serrata Brown, in Brown & Powell, 1991
Cuproxena speculana (Walsingham, 1914)
Cuproxena subunicolora Brown & Obraztsov in Brown & Powell, 1991
Cuproxena tarijae Razowski & Wojtusiak, 2013
Cuproxena trema Brown & Obraztsov in Brown & Powell, 1991
Cuproxena triphera Brown & Obraztsov in Brown & Powell, 1991
Cuproxena virifloscula Brown, in Brown & Powell, 1991

See also
List of Tortricidae genera

References

 , 2005, World Catalogue of Insects 5
 , 1991, Univ. Calif. Publ. Ent. 111: 48.
 , 2007: Chrysoxena-group of genera from Ecuador (Lepidoptera: Tortricidae). Shilap Revista de Lepidopterologica 35 (137): 33–46. Full article: .
 , 2008: Eight new species of the genera Vulpoxena , Cuproxena and Bidorpitia of the Chrysoxena group of genera from Ecuador. (Lepidoptera: Tortricidae). Genus 19 (1): 113–123. Full article: 
 , 2010: Tortricidae (Lepidoptera) from Peru. Acta Zoologica Cracoviensia 53B (1-2): 73-159. . Full article: .

External links
tortricidae.com

 
Tortricidae genera